The European Rugby Continental Shield (formerly the European Rugby Challenge Cup Qualifying Competition) was a rugby union competition, organised by European Professional Club Rugby, Rugby Europe and the Federazione Italiana Rugby, for entry into the European Rugby Challenge Cup.

The  Qualifying Competition was first announced in April 2014, at the same time as the announcement of the creation of the European Rugby Champions Cup and Challenge Cup competitions. The tournament featured teams from non-EPCR countries, such as Spain, Germany, Belgium, Romania, Georgia, Russia and Portugal, as well as select Italian Eccellenza clubs. In 2016–17, the qualification competition also became a European Rugby competition in its own right, the third tier European Rugby Continental Shield, with both successful play-off teams meeting in a final as a part of European Rugby Finals weekend.

Both editions of the Shield final were won by Russian club Enisey-STM.

The competition is the first third-tier European tournament since the suspension of the Parker Pen Shield in 2005.

The competition was discontinued after the 2018–19 edition.

Format
Under the Heads of Agreement announced on 10 April 2014, there were two places available in the European Rugby Challenge Cup through the Qualifying Competition.

For the 2014–15 season, given the time constraints in filling the competition, this was a reduced competition the form of 2 two-legged play-off matches, with the aggregate winners of each taking one of the two Rugby Europe spots in the draw, and it involved the 2 best teams from Italy's National Championship of Excellence, plus a Romanian and Georgian selection.

An expanded format was announced on 22 December 2014, the expanded format includes clubs from non-EPCR Unions Russia, Spain and Portugal alongside representatives from the Italian Eccellenza.

The 6 teams in the Qualifying Competition are split into 2 pools of 3 teams each. Each team will play the other teams in their pool once, before the two pool winners compete in a two-legged play-off against the teams currently competing in the Challenge Cup from the previous Qualifying Competition.

The winners, on aggregate, of these two play-offs will take up the Qualifying Competition places in the Challenge Cup.

In 2017, the competition was rebranded as the European Rugby Continental Shield, and it was announced that the two qualifiers would play each other as part of the EPCR's finals weekend, a practice which was discontinued for 2018–19.

Summary of results

Continental Shield Finals

Qualifying play-off results

Tournaments

2014
The reduced format for the inaugural Qualifying Competition included two Italian Clubs, a Romanian and a Georgian side. Sides were paired up and competed in two matches, home and away. The winners, on aggregate, of these two games received one of the two places in the 2014–15 European Rugby Challenge Cup.

Rugby Europe 1 play-off

 Rovigo Delta won the play-off 46 – 39 on aggregate, and qualifies as Rugby Europe 1 for the 2014–15 European Rugby Challenge Cup.

Rugby Europe 2 play-off

 București Wolves won the play-off 28 – 26 on aggregate, and qualified as Rugby Europe 2 for the 2014–15 European Rugby Challenge Cup.

2015
The expanded competition for entry into the 2015–16 European Rugby Challenge Cup features six teams, in two pools of three. Russia is represented in European competition for the first time.
Matches are scheduled for the same weekends as the 2014–15 Challenge Cup, beginning with the 5th Round of the Challenge Cup.

Pool 1

Qualifying play-off

 Calvisano won the play-off 52–24 on aggregate, and will play in the 2015–16 European Rugby Challenge Cup.

Pool 2

Qualifying play-off

 Enisey-STM won the play-off 63–32 on aggregate, and will play in the 2015–16 European Rugby Challenge Cup.

2015–16
The Qualifying Competition was once again expanded, this time featuring 8 teams in two pools of four. Each team will play the teams in the other pool once. Belgium and Germany are represented in pan-European Rugby competition for the first time, through Royal Kituro and Heidelberger RK respectively.

Fixtures

Qualifying play-offs

 On aggregate, Enisey-STM (Aggregate score: 70–5) and Timișoara Saracens (Aggregate score: 64–40) qualify for the 2016–17 European Rugby Challenge Cup.

2016–17

The format of the Qualifying Competition remains similar to the previous season. As before, two places in the next year's Challenge Cup will be available for teams in the Qualifying Competition.

This season's competition features clubs from the domestic leagues of non-EPCR unions Russia, Spain, Germany and Belgium, as well as four representatives from the Italian Eccellenza.

The eight participating clubs will compete in two pools with each club in Pool A playing once against each club in Pool B.

The two pool winners will then play off against Timișoara Saracens of Romania and Russia's Enisei-STM on a home and away basis to decide which two clubs will qualify for the 2017–18 Challenge Cup.

Mid-season it was announced the competition would become the European Rugby Continental Shield and the two qualifiers will play a final match as part of EPCR's 2017 Edinburgh Finals weekend.

Fixtures

Qualifying play-offs
EPCR will determine about one open question: If it was like the past years, according to the rating, Krasny Yar Krasnoyarsk would meet with the Romanian Timișoara. But Krasny Yar received a letter that EPCR will hold a meeting on the final round of qualifying Challenge Cup, which will be determined the opponents. 
On February 14, at the office of RK "Yenisei-STM" received a letter signed by the coordinator of the qualifying competitions EPCR Vincent Prebande. Mr. Prebande reports that, like last year, the second stage of Qualifying teams will play in accordance with the principle of sport. The two-legged confrontation "Yenisei-STM" will meet the Italian club "Mogliano" and "Krasny Yar" - with the Romanian club "Timișoara Saracens".

 On aggregate, Enisey-STM (Aggregate score: 97–7) and Krasny Yar (Aggregate score: 39–35) qualify for the 2017–18 European Rugby Challenge Cup.

Continental Shield Final

2017–18

The format of the Qualifying Competition remains similar to the previous season. As before, two places in the next year's Challenge Cup will be available for teams in the Continental Shield. Clubs from six countries will compete in the 2017–18 Continental Shield.

Four representatives from the Italian Eccellenza – Pataro Rugby Calvisano, Femi-CZ Rugby Rovigo, Rugby Petrarca and Rugby Viadana – will be joined by Romania's Timișoara Saracens, RC Batumi from Georgia, Heidelberger RK of Germany and Portugal's Centro Desportivo Universitario de Lisboa (CDUL Rugby) competing in two pools of four.

Following the pool stage matches, the winners of Pool A will play the runners-up in Pool B, and the winners of Pool B will play the runners-up in Pool A on a home and away basis.

The two clubs which advance will then play each other home and away with the winners securing a place in the Continental Shield final in Bilbao next May and also qualifying for the 2018–19 Challenge Cup.

The other Continental Shield finalist will be decided by a home and away play-off between Russia's Enisei-STM and Krasny Yar who have both received a bye into the knockout stage of the competition due to their participation in this season's Challenge Cup and to their success in last season's Continental Shield.

The winners of the Enisei-STM v Krasny Yar play-offs will go through to the Continental Shield final in Bilbao and will also qualify for the 2018–19 Challenge Cup.

The aim of the Continental Shield is to widen the footprint of club rugby across Europe and to give both emerging and established clubs in different territories the opportunity to qualify for the Challenge Cup.

Fixtures

Pool play-offs

 On aggregate, Timișoara Saracens (Aggregate score: 32–18) and Heidelberger RK (Aggregate score: 51–42) qualify for Qualifying play-offs.

Qualifying play-offs

Despite Heidelberger RK  defeating Timișoara Saracens with the aggregate score of 47-41 and going into the Challenge Cup for the first time, Heidelberger RK have been disqualified from the Challenge Cup so Timișoara Saracens will replace them.

Continental Shield Final

2018–19

Clubs from Italy, Georgia and Belgium competed in the 2018/19 Continental Shield with a place in the Challenge Cup up for grabs.

Four sides from the Italian Eccellenza – Argos Rugby Petrarca, Pataro Calvisano, Femi-CZ Rugby Rovigo Delta and GS Fiamme Oro Rugby – were joined by Georgia's RC Locomotive Tbilisi and Belgian representatives, Belgium Rugby Barbarians XV, competing in two pools of three.

Locomotive Tbilisi, Calvisano and Fiamme Oro from Rome were drawn in Pool A while Pool B was made up of Petrarca, Belgium Rugby Barbarians XV and Rovigo. Clubs in the same pool played one another on a home and away basis and the two pool winners played off over two legs to decide which club qualified for the 2019/20 Challenge Cup.

A further place in the 2019/20 Challenge Cup was decided by a home and away play-off between Russia's Enisei-STM and Timișoara Saracens of Romania who are both competing in this season's Challenge Cup.

The aim of the Continental Shield is to widen the footprint of club rugby across Europe and to give both emerging and established clubs in different territories the opportunity to qualify for the Challenge Cup.

The Continental Shield, which was won for the second time by Enisei-STM in Bilbao in 2017–18, is organised by EPCR in conjunction with Rugby Europe and the Italian Rugby Federation (FIR).

Fixtures

Qualifying play-offs

 On aggregate, Enisey-STM (aggregate score: 58–52) and Calvisano (aggregate score: 57-43) qualify for the 2019–20 European Rugby Challenge Cup.

See also
 European Rugby Challenge Cup
 Rugby Europe

References

Qualifying
Rugby union competitions in Europe for clubs and provinces
Shield
Recurring sporting events established in 2014
Multi-national professional rugby union leagues